Xanthostemon sebertii was a species of plant in the family Myrtaceae. It was endemic to New Caledonia.

References

sebertii
Flora of New Caledonia
Extinct flora of Oceania
Plant extinctions since 1500
Taxonomy articles created by Polbot